Summerskill may refer to:

Ben Summerskill OBE (born 1961), British businessman and journalist, Chief Executive of Stonewall
Edith Summerskill, Baroness Summerskill CH PC (1901–1980), British physician, feminist, Labour politician and writer
John Summerskill (1925–1990), educator and president of San Francisco State University in the 1960s
Mimi LaFollette Summerskill (1917–2008), educator, author, political activist, and vineyard owner
Shirley Summerskill (born 1931), British Labour Party politician and former government minister

See also
Summerhill (disambiguation)
Summersville (disambiguation)